Sigurjónsson or Sigurjonsson may refer to:

Bragi Sigurjónsson (1910–1995), Icelandic politician and former minister
Frosti Sigurjónsson (born 1962), Icelandic businessman and politician
Gordon Sigurjonsson (1883–1967), Icelandic athlete and trainer
Guðmundur Sigurjónsson (born 1947), Icelandic chess grandmaster
Jóhann Sigurjónsson (1880–1919), Icelandic playwright and poet
John Snorri Sigurjónsson (1973–2021), Icelandic high-altitude mountaineer
Oliver Sigurjónsson (born 1995), Icelandic football midfielder,
Rúnar Már Sigurjónsson (born 1990), Icelandic professional footballer
Sigurður Sigurjónsson (born 1955), AKA Siggi Sigurjóns, Icelandic actor, comedian and screenwriter

See also
Sigurð Joensen
Sigurd Jonsson